Amir Shahreen Abd Mubin (born 27 June 1983) is a Kazakhstan born Malaysian professional footballer. He operates as a midfielder for Malacca United F.C.

Malacca United F.C.
On 8 February 2014, Amir scored his first goal for Malacca United F.C. in a friendly match against Harimau Muda A.

References

External links
 https://web.archive.org/web/20140222060602/http://www.ifball.com/index.php?option=com_joomleague&view=player&p=8%3Apfa-2014&tid=41%3Amelaka-telekom&pid=1250%3Aamir-shahreen-abd-mubin
 http://www.goal.com/en-ng/people/kazakhstan/66705/amir-shahreen-bin-abdul-mubin
 https://web.archive.org/web/20140521221711/http://www.sport195.com/athletes/amir_shahreen_mubin_6930/preview
 https://web.archive.org/web/20140222055037/http://www.sports247.my/tag/amir-shahreen-mubin/

Malaysian footballers
Living people
1983 births
Felda United F.C. players
Place of birth missing (living people)
Melaka United F.C. players
Kazakhstani emigrants to Malaysia
Citizens of Malaysia through descent
Association football midfielders